Kunal Lal (born 17 January 1984) is an Indian former cricketer. He played thirteen first-class matches for Delhi between 2003 and 2007.

See also
 List of Delhi cricketers

References

External links
 

1984 births
Living people
Indian cricketers
Delhi cricketers
Ahmedabad Rockets cricketers
Cricketers from Ghaziabad, Uttar Pradesh